Balderschwang is a municipality in the district of Oberallgäu in Bavaria in Germany.

See also
Balderschwang Yew

References

External links
Municipal website

Oberallgäu